This is a list of current, re-runs and former television programs on Disney Channel in Southeast Asia and Bangladesh.

Former Programming

Disney Channel Originals

Live Action

Animated

Disney XD Originals

Animated

Live-action

Acquired programming

Animated

Live-action

Notes

References

External links
 Disney Channel Asia Schedule (except Singapore & Indonesia)
 Disney Channel Indonesia Schedule

Disney Channel
Disney Channel related-lists